Vasilios Daniil (born 3 August 1938) is a Greek football manager of national reputation.

He managed Kavala, Kastoria, Apollon Kalamarias, Panathinaikos, Olympiakos Volos, Skoda Xanthi, Paniliakos and Greece.

He made his official debut as the coach of Greece on 31 March 1999 in an away match against Latvia (0-0), for the Euro 2000 qualifiers.

Honours
 Greek Championship: 1
Panathinaikos 1991
 Greek Cup: 1
Panathinaikos 1991

References

External links
Profile at Skoda Xanthi official site

Living people
Greek football managers
Greece national football team managers
Panathinaikos F.C. managers
Athlitiki Enosi Larissa F.C. managers
Xanthi F.C. managers
Apollon Pontou FC managers
1938 births
Kavala F.C. managers
Olympiacos Volos F.C. managers
Footballers from Kavala